Lorenia Iveth Valles Sampedro (born 18 December 1976) is a Mexican politician affiliated with the Partido Movimiento Regeneración Nacional (Morena). As of 2013 she served as Deputy of the LXII Legislature of the Mexican Congress representing Sonora.

References

1976 births
Living people
People from Hermosillo
Politicians from Sonora
Women members of the Chamber of Deputies (Mexico)
Party of the Democratic Revolution politicians
21st-century Mexican politicians
21st-century Mexican women politicians
Deputies of the LXII Legislature of Mexico
Members of the Chamber of Deputies (Mexico) for Sonora